Tris(2-aminoethyl)amine is the organic compound with the formula N(CH2CH2NH2)3. This colourless liquid is soluble in water and is highly basic, consisting of a tertiary amine center and three pendant primary amine groups.  Abbreviated tren or TREN it is a crosslinking agent in the synthesis of polyimine networks and a tripodal ligand in coordination chemistry.

Tren is a C3-symmetric, tetradentate chelating ligand that forms stable complexes with transition metals, especially those in the 2+ and 3+ oxidation states. Tren complexes exist with relatively few isomers, reflecting the constrained connectivity of this tetramine. Thus, only a single achiral stereoisomer exists for [Co(tren)X2]+, where X is halide or pseudohalide. In contrast, for [Co(trien)X2]+ five diastereomers are possible, four of which are chiral.  In a few cases, tren serves as a tridentate ligand with one of the primary amine groups non-coordinated. Tren is a common impurity in the more common triethylenetetramine ("trien"). As a trifunctional amine, tren forms a triisocyanate when derivatized with COCl2.

It condenses with aldehydes to give imines.

N-methylated derivatives
The permethylated derivative of tren has the formula N(CH2CH2NMe2)3. "Me6tren" forms a variety of complexes but, unlike tren, does not stabilize Co(III).  Related amino-triphosphines are also well developed, such as N(CH2CH2PPh2)3 (m.p. 101-102 °C).  This species is prepared from the nitrogen mustard N(CH2CH2Cl)3.

N,N,N-trimethyltren, N(CH2CH2NHMe)3 is also available.

Safety considerations
(H2NCH2CH2)3N, like other polyamines, is corrosive. It causes severe skin burns and eye damage, is harmful if inhaled due to the destruction of respiratory tissues, is toxic if swallowed, and can be fatal in contact with skin. Its median lethal dose is 246 mg/kg, oral (rat), and 117 mg/kg, dermal (rabbit). It is also combustible.

References

Ethyleneamines
Tripodal ligands
Tertiary amines